Joseph Stone is the name of:

Joseph Stone, Baron Stone (1903–1986), officer in the British Army, doctor, and royal peer
Joseph Champlin Stone (1829–1902), U.S. Representative from Iowa
Joseph Stone (screenwriter), screenwriter, see Academy Award for Best Writing (Original Screenplay)

See also
Joseph Stones (1892–1917), British soldier executed for cowardice